Nor Zila binti Aminuddin (Jawi: نور زيل بنت أمين الدين ;; born July 31, 1966) better known by her stage name Ella, is a Malaysian musician, singer, actress, model, and entrepreneur. She began her career in 1983 at age 19 with a local band called Moonracker. She left the band after two years, continuing her career singing at local night clubs. A local band called The Boys approached Ella, and they later became Ella & The Boys. Ella is known as Ratu Rock (Malay for the Queen of Rock) by her fans in Malaysia.

Biography 
She attended Tengku Ampuan Rahimah High School in Klang Valley. She started her career as a singer at local night clubs and lounges. While singing in one of those clubs, Ella was approached by a band called The Boys, which she later merged with to create Ella & The Boys. On 10 June 2012, Ella and her protege, Puteri Caroline Kamel, won TV3's Mentor Season 6 talent search. On 7 July 2012, Ella married Azhar Ghazali, a pilot 15 years her junior.

Discography

Studio albums

Compilation albums

Video album(s)

Filmography

Film

Telemovie

Television

References

External links
 Ella Aminuddin Official Fanpage on Facebook
 Official Twitter
 

1966 births
Living people
Malaysian people of Malay descent
Malaysian women pop singers
People from Penang
Malay-language singers
Malaysian pop rock singers
Malaysian rock singers
Malaysian film actresses
Malaysian television actresses
Moroccan people of Malay descent
Saudi Arabian people of Malay descent